The  is a temple of the Church of Jesus Christ of Latter-day Saints (LDS Church) in Sapporo, Hokkaido, Japan, dedicated in 2016.

History

The intent to construct the temple was announced by church president Thomas S. Monson on October 3, 2009, during the church's semi-annual general conference. Completed in 2016, the intent to build the temple was announced concurrently with the Brigham City Utah, Concepción Chile, Fort Lauderdale Florida and Fortaleza Brazil temples; together, at the time, they brought the total number of temples worldwide to 151. It is the third church temple in Japan. Ground was broken on 22 October 2011 by Gary E. Stevenson. Michael T. Ringwood and Koichi Aoyagi of the Seventy were also present.

A public open house was held from July 8–23, 2016, excluding Sundays. The temple was formally dedicated by Russell M. Nelson on August 21, 2016.

In 2020, the Sapporo Japan Temple was closed temporarily during the year in response to the COVID-19 pandemic.

See also

 Comparison of temples of The Church of Jesus Christ of Latter-day Saints
 List of temples of The Church of Jesus Christ of Latter-day Saints
 List of temples of The Church of Jesus Christ of Latter-day Saints by geographic region
 Temple architecture (Latter-day Saints)
 The Church of Jesus Christ of Latter-day Saints in Japan

References

External links
Sapporo Japan Temple Official site
Sapporo Japan Temple at ChurchofJesusChristTemples.org

21st-century Latter Day Saint temples
2016 establishments in Japan
2016 in Christianity
Religious buildings and structures in Hokkaido
Buildings and structures in Sapporo
Temples (LDS Church) in Japan
The Church of Jesus Christ of Latter-day Saints in Japan
Religious buildings and structures completed in 2016